Dušan Jovanović may refer to:

 Dušan Jovanović (footballer) (born 1971), retired Yugoslavian/Serbian footballer
 Dušan Jovanović (theatre director) (1939–2020), Slovene theatre director and writer
Dušan Jovanović, a boy who was murdered in Belgrade in 1997; see Murder of Dušan Jovanović
 Dušan Jovanović, Serbian civilian awarded the status of Righteous among the Nations by Yad Vashem; see List of Serbian Righteous Among the Nations